Boom! is a 1968 British drama film directed by Joseph Losey and starring Elizabeth Taylor, Richard Burton and Noël Coward. It was adapted by Tennessee Williams from his own play The Milk Train Doesn't Stop Here Anymore.

Plot
Flora 'Sissy' Goforth (Taylor, in a part written for an older woman) is a terminally-ill woman living with a coterie of servants, whom she verbally abuses, in a large mansion on a secluded Italian island. Into her life comes a mysterious man, Christopher Flanders, nicknamed "Il Angelo Dellamorte" "The Angel of Death" (played by then-husband Burton, in a part intended for a younger man). Christopher claims to have met her previously, while Flora, for her part, affects not to remember having met him before. Flora is said to suffer from neuritis and several other kinds of "-itis."

In her complex of villas wired for sound, so she can at any moment resume her dictation, Flora is dictating her memoirs detailing her multiple marriages, and her affair with her only love - a now-deceased poet. She is interrupted when her guard dogs attack Christopher as he climbs the cliff side to her estate. She has her secretary Miss Black, (whom she calls 'Blackie' throughout the film), set him up in a villa for him to recuperate. She also provides him with a samurai warrior’s robe, with accomanying sword, to wear in lieu of his clothes that had been shredded from the dog attack.

She invites The Witch of Capri (Coward), to dinner on her terrace. The 'Witch' informs her of Christopher’s nickname and his history of visiting the dying shortly before their demise. Flora becomes convinced that he indeed may be an omen of her own impending doom, though she is in denial of it. Christopher meanwhile flagrantly seduces Miss Black, whose husband had died the year previously. 

The interaction between Goforth and Flanders forms the backbone for the rest of the film, with both of the major characters voicing lines of dialogue that carry allegorical and Symbolist significance, such as Flora’s speech to The Witch about present moments becoming instant memories and Christopher speaking about the sound of the ocean waves signifying the sound of each moment people are still alive (the titular “boom”).

The movie mingles respect and contempt for human beings who, like Goforth, continue to deny their own death, even as it draws closer and closer. It examines how these characters can enlist and redirect their fading erotic drive into the reinforcement of this denial.

Flora begins to become enamored by Christopher, as well as terrified of him. She fluctuates between emotional vulnerability and being bombastic and heated. She drives Miss Black to quit her secretarial job and grows weaker as the day turns into night.

As she lies in bed dying, Christopher takes her huge diamond ring (a symbol of taking away his “victim’s” life), and tells her a story of how he helped an old man with low quality of life drown and end his suffering. Flora dies following the speech and Christopher throws her ring off the cliff. The film ends with the sight of waves crashing and Christopher murmuring, “Boom.”

Cast
 Elizabeth Taylor as Flora 'Sissy' Goforth
 Richard Burton as Christopher Flanders
 Noël Coward as The Witch of Capri 
 Joanna Shimkus as Miss Black
 Michael Dunn as Rudi
 Romolo Valli as Dr. Luilo 
 Fernando Piazza as Etti
 Veronica Wells as Simonetta 
 Howard Taylor as Journalist

Production
Elizabeth Taylor's career was in decline by 1968, due to her age and recent box-office failures. She sought to use another adaption of Tennessee Williams's work to revitalize he career. The Milk Train Doesn't Stop Here Anymore was unsuccessful during its run, but Universal Pictures had already acquired the film rights for the play.

The film was retitled multiple times to Boom, Sunburst, and Goforth before Boom! was selected. The film was shot on Sardinia and a mansion set was constructed for $500,000. Production was delayed after Taylor contracted bronchitis the day that filming was meant to start. During filming Taylor's pet monkey stole a $1,600 jewel case and was missing for a year. Taylor received a $60,000 brooch from producer John Heyman and Bulgari loaned $2 million of jewels for the film.

A trailer that served as her dressing room came loose from its moorings only a few seconds after Taylor stepped out of it, and "plunged over a 150-foot embankment into the sea". Built especially for the film, the mansion of Mrs. Flora Goforth is situated high atop the limestone cliffs of Isola de Presa, a small island in the Mediterranean off the coast of Sardinia. Along the bluffs are replicas of the Easter Island moai heads, six of them, representing perhaps the spirits of the six husbands she outlived. Some interiors of the mansion were sets in Rome.

Reception
The film was received poorly by critics. On Rotten Tomatoes it has an approval rating of 20% based on reviews from 15 critics. Variety stated that the film was "one of the biggest box-office losers of the year".

Time wrote "They display the self-indulgent fecklessness of a couple of rich amateurs hamming it up at the country-club." The film was refer to as a "a pointless, pompous nightmare" by Newsweek, an "ordeal in tedium" by The Hollywood Reporter, "outright junk" by Saturday Review, and the Los Angeles Herald Examiner asked "Why was Boom! ever filmed in the first place?".

Richard Schickel, writing in Life, stated that "title could not be more apt; it is precisely the sound of a bomb exploding."

Filmmaker John Waters admires the film, and chose it as a favorite to present in the first Maryland Film Festival in 1999. The film's poster is visible in Waters' 1972 film Pink Flamingos. In an interview with Robert K. Elder for his book The Best Film You've Never Seen, Waters describes the film as "beyond bad. It's the other side of camp. It's beautiful, atrocious, and it's perfect. It's a perfect movie, really, and I never tire of it."

During the 17th Rome Film Fest (October 2022) was premiered the documentary "A summer with Joe, Liz & Richard" (“L’estate di Joe, Liz e Richard”), written and directed by Sergio Naitza, The film is the backstage of "Boom!" by Joseph Losey, and rebuilds the adventurous story of that set with the testimonies, among the others, of John Waters, Joanna Shimkus, Patricia Losey, Michel Ciment, Gianni Bozzacchi, Valerio de Paolis, Gianni Bulgari, Viram Jasani and with Giulia Naitza in the role of the tourist guide on the locations in Capo Caccia - Alghero.

References

Works cited

External links
 
 
 
 

1968 films
1968 drama films
1960s English-language films
British drama films
British films based on plays
Films based on works by Tennessee Williams
Films directed by Joseph Losey
Films scored by John Barry (composer)
Films set in country houses
Films set on islands
Films shot in Sardinia
Films with screenplays by Tennessee Williams
Universal Pictures films
1960s British films